Bobbie Shaw Chance (born Barbara Shisoff; September 16, 1943) is an actress best known for her appearances in American International Pictures' beach party movies of the 1960s.

Biography
Shaw was a singer and dancer in Las Vegas. She was spotted by a talent scout for American International Pictures and cast in Pajama Party (1964). Response was strong so she was cast in several more movies for the studio. After several films for AIP she worked with Rob Reiner, Larry Bishop, Richard Dreyfuss and others in the Los Angeles improvisational comedy troupe, The Sessions, for a number of years.

Bobbie Shaw married her husband Lawrence Chance and together they opened the Hollywood Actor's Showcase. She runs this with her son Richie Chance.

Filmography

References

External links

Bobbi Shaw at Brians Drive In Theatre
Official website

1943 births
Living people
American actresses
21st-century American women